The Philocalia may refer to:
 Philokalia (Origen), compiled by Basil the Great and Gregory Nazianzen
 Philokalia, a medieval compilation of sayings of the Fathers of the Church
 Philocaleia, a town of ancient Pontus, now in Turkey